Chris Raschka (born March 6, 1959) is an American illustrator, writer, and violist. He contributed to children's literature as a children's illustrator. He was U.S. nominee for the biennial, international Hans Christian Andersen Medal in 2012.

Yo! Yes? was a Caldecott Honor Book in 1994 but Raschka may be most famous for his Hello, Goodbye Window, winner of the 2006 Caldecott Medal, and his book A Ball for Daisy, which won the 2012 Caldecott Medal.

Raschka was born in Huntingdon, Pennsylvania. Though he grew up in suburban Chicago, Illinois, he spent part of his childhood in Austria, his mother's homeland. He is a graduate of St. Olaf College. Now he lives in New York City.

Raschka is the author and illustrator of Charlie Parker Played Be Bop, an introduction to the saxophone player and composer Charlie Parker (Scholastic, 1997).

Selected works

Another Important Book (illustrator)
Arlene Sardine
A Ball for Daisy
The Blushful Hippopotamus
Can't Sleep
Charlie Parker Played Be Bop
Circle Time (shorts for Playhouse Disney)
Daisy Gets Lost
Elizabeth Imagined an Iceberg
Everyone Can Learn to Ride a Bicycle
Farmy Farm
Fishing in the Air (illustrator)
Five for a Little One
A Foot in the Mouth (illustrator)
The Genie in the Jar (illustrator)
Good Sports: Rhymes about Running, Jumping, Throwing, and More (illustrator)
Granny Torrelli Makes Soup (illustrator)
Grump Groan Growl (illustrator)
Happy to Be Nappy (illustrator)
Home at Last (children's book)|Home at Last (illustrator)
The Hello, Goodbye Window (illustrator)
Hip Hop Dog (author)
John Coltrane's Giant Steps
A Kick in the Head (illustrator)
Little Black Crow
Little Tree (illustrator)
Moosey Moose
Mysterious Thelonious
Peter and the Wolf (adaptor, illustrator)
A Poke in the I (illustrator)
The Purple Balloon
Ring! Yo?
Seriously, Norman
Side by Side : A Celebration of Dads
Simple Gifts: A Shaker Hymn
Talk To Me About the Alphabet
Whaley Whale
Why Did the Chicken Cross the Road?( illustrator)
Wormy Worm
Yo! Yes?
If You Were a Dog

See also

References

External links
 The Rif.org Article
 Virginia Johnson's Article
 HarperChildren
 Scholastic Bookwizard: Chris Raschka
 

1959 births
American children's writers
Caldecott Medal winners
American children's book illustrators
American people of Austrian descent
St. Olaf College alumni
Living people